Stephen Michael "Steve" Martino (born July 21, 1959) is an American designer and film director. He is best known for directing the films Horton Hears a Who! (2008), Ice Age: Continental Drift (2012), and The Peanuts Movie (2015).

Early life
Martino went to Ohio State University where he studied design. After graduation, he heard computer animation pioneer Chuck Csuri speak. "I was absolutely blown away. No one was doing what he was showing us. I hadn't seen images like that anywhere before," Martino said. He returned to the university and earned in 1989 a master's degree, studying at the Computer Graphics Research Group (later renamed to Advanced Computing Center for the Arts and Design), founded by Csuri.

Career
After graduation, Steve went to Los Angeles, where he worked in animation and visual effects. In 2001, he joined Connecticut-based Blue Sky Studios. There he co-directed computer-animated Horton Hears a Who! and Ice Age: Continental Drift. He directed The Peanuts Movie (2015), an animated feature film adaptation of Charles M. Schulz's comic strip Peanuts.

In February 2018, it was reported that Martino and Karen Disher would direct an upcoming animated fantasy musical, under the working title The Fright Stuff, for Blue Sky Studios. The film was originally scheduled for release in 2023, but was moved to an unknown date. The production studio was closed in 2021.

Filmography

Director
Film
 Dr. Seuss' Horton Hears a Who! (2008)
 Ice Age: Continental Drift (2012)
 The Peanuts Movie (2015)

Short film
 Scrat's Continental Crack-up (2010)
 Scrat's Continental Crack-up - Part 2 (2011)

Art director

Film
 Robots (2005)

Short Films
 Gone Nutty (2002)

Television
 World of Discovery (1990) (Main title designer)

Other roles
 Ice Age: The Meltdown (2006) (Pre-Production Consultant)
 Spies in Disguise (2019) (Senior Creative Team)

Critical reception

Awards and nominations

References

External links

 

American animated film directors
Living people
Blue Sky Studios people
1959 births
People from Dayton, Ohio
Film directors from Ohio